Henry Olin (May 7, 1768August 18, 1837) was an American lawyer and politician. He served as a United States representative from Vermont and eighth lieutenant governor of Vermont.

Biography
Olin was born in Shaftsbury in the New Hampshire Grants (now Vermont) on May 7, 1768 to Justin Olin and Sally Dwinell Olin. He attended the common schools. He studied law and was admitted to the bar. He moved to Leicester in the Vermont Republic in 1788 and began the practice of law.

Olin served in the Vermont House of Representatives from 1799 to 1804, 1806 to 1815, 1817 to 1819 and 1822 to 1824. He was a delegate to the State constitutional conventions in 1814, 1822, and 1828.  He was associate judge and then chief judge of the Addison County Court from 1801 to 1824. He served as a member of the executive council in 1820 and 1821.

Olin was elected to the Eighteenth Congress as a Democratic-Republican candidate to fill the vacancy caused by the death of Charles Rich. He served in Congress from December 13, 1824 to March 3, 1825. He was elected as the Lieutenant Governor of Vermont, and served from 1827 to 1830.

Family life
Henry Olin married Lois Richardson in 1788 and they had ten children. Following her death, he married Polly Sanford Olin and they had one child. Olin was the nephew of Gideon Olin, who also served as a United States Representative from Vermont.  Gideon Olin's son, Judge Abram B. Olin, was Henry Olin's cousin.

Death
Olin died on August 18, 1837 in Salisbury, Vermont. He is interred at Brookside Cemetery in Leicester, Vermont.

References

External links
 

Information from the Vermont Archives

The Political Graveyard
govtrack.us
Olin Family Society
Bench and Bar of Adison County

1768 births
1837 deaths
People from Leicester, Vermont
People from Shaftsbury, Vermont
Vermont lawyers
Vermont state court judges
Members of the Vermont House of Representatives
Democratic-Republican Party members of the United States House of Representatives from Vermont
19th-century American lawyers